Lázaro Cárdenas Municipality may refer to:
 Lázaro Cárdenas Municipality, Michoacán
 Lázaro Cárdenas Municipality, Quintana Roo
 Lázaro Cárdenas Municipality, Tlaxcala

See also 
 Lázaro Cárdenas (disambiguation)

Municipality name disambiguation pages